Mount Gloria is located on the border of Alberta and British Columbia on the Continental Divide in Canada. It was named in 1913 by the Interprovincial Boundary Survey after Lake Gloria which lies directly north of the mountain.


Geology
The mountain is composed of sedimentary rock laid down during the Precambrian to Jurassic periods. Formed in shallow seas, this sedimentary rock was pushed east and over the top of younger rock during the Laramide orogeny.

Climate
Based on the Köppen climate classification, Mount Gloria is located in a subarctic climate with cold, snowy winters, and mild summers.

See also
List of peaks on the British Columbia–Alberta border

References

Two-thousanders of Alberta
Two-thousanders of British Columbia
Canadian Rockies